Nekrasovka District  is an administrative district (raion) of South-Eastern Administrative Okrug, and one of the 125 raions of Moscow, Russia. Population: 68,539 (2017 est.)

See also
Administrative divisions of Moscow

References

Notes

Sources

Districts of Moscow